Ambaghai or Hambaqai Khan (? – died 1156) was a Khan of the Khamag Mongol, succeeded to his cousin Khabul Khan, he was one of the great-grandsons of Khaidu Khan and the cousin and predecessor of Hotula Khan, he was the Leader of Taichud Clan one of sub-branch of Borjigid, and also Grandson of and successor of Charaqai Lingqum.

Life 

Ambaghai was born to Sorqaduqtu China, a son of Charaqai Lingqum who in turn was son of Khaidu Khan. His father is mentioned as Senggüm Bilge in The Secret History of the Mongols. A member of the cadet branch of Borjigin clan, he was ruler of the Taichuud tribe and later khan of Khamag Mongol. According to Rashidaddin, he succeeded Khabul Khan, because he was seniormost in Borjigid line. Toward the end of his rule, he was captured alongside Khabul Khan's son Tödö'en Otchigin by the Tatars when he was on a trip to marry his son Qadaan Taishi to a daughter of the chief of the Airu'ut Tatars. In fact, this was done under the commands of the Jurchen Jin dynasty in response to the Mongols' growing power. He was brought to the Jin capital Zhongdu, crucified, and then hacked to death. Sources do not give exact date on Ambaghai's reign or death date. According to Chih-Shu Eva Cheng's calculation, he died  at same time as Marcus, khan of the Naimans and father of Cyriacus. While Christoph Baumer states he reigned through 1146–1156. He was followed by Hotula Khan, his distant cousin.

His son Qadaan Taishi followed him as de facto chief of Taichuud and joined Hotula Khan on his campaigns against Tatars. But he was poisoned in 1160s, possibly by his brothers and cousins over succession. Qadaan seems to be succeeded by Targutai Kiriltuk - a rival of Genghis Khan later.

In 1211 Genghis Khan instigated the Mongol–Jin War, ending in the fall of the Jin dynasty, in sworn revenge for Ambaghai's kidnapping and execution.

Family 
He left several sons with his two wives - Orbei and Sokhatai:

 Adal Khan
 Targutai Kiriltuk (d. 1201) — chief of Taichuuds and a rival of Genghis Khan.
 Au'chu Baghatur
 Qadaan Taishi
 Quril Baghatur
 Töda'a — one of the sub-chiefs of Taichuuds during reign of Genghis Khan.
 Qodun Orchang
 Bakhachi
 Udor Bayan

In Media 

 He was portrayed by Wuri Jitu in Genghis Khan (2004 TV series).

References

See also
Family tree of Genghis Khan
Ambagyan- Khagan of the Khitan Empire

Executed Mongolian people
Executed monarchs
12th-century Mongol rulers
12th-century executions
People executed by the Jin dynasty (1115–1234)
People executed by crucifixion
Year of birth unknown
Tengrist monarchs